Half-Breed may refer to:

 Half-breed, a derogatory term for a person of mixed race
 Half-Breed (album), a 1973 album by Cher
 "Half-Breed" (song), the title track
 "Half-Breed" (short story), a science fiction story by Isaac Asimov
 Halfbreed (album), a 1968 album by the Keef Hartley Band
 Half Breed (film), a 1913 Swedish film
 The Half-Breed (1916 film), directed by Allan Dwan and starring Douglas Fairbanks
 The Half Breed (1922 film), an American silent film directed by Charles A. Taylor
 The Half-Breed, a 1952 American film starring Robert Young
 Half-Breed (politics), member of the moderate wing of the United States Republican Party in the late 19th century
 Halfbreed Billy Gram, American professional wrestler and entertainer
 Halfbreed, a memoir by Maria Campbell

See also
 Half-caste